The European Union tax haven blacklist, officially the EU list of non-cooperative tax jurisdictions, is a tool of the European Union (EU) that lists tax havens. It is used by the Member States to undermine tax competition. It was adopted for the first time in 2017 as a response to tax avoidance in the EU, screening 92 countries. It is managed by the Code of Conduct Group for Business Taxation and monitored by the European Commission (EC). The most recent revision was released on 6 October 2020. The list is updated twice a year.

Criteria for listing and history

Criteria
Jurisdictions that do not comply with all three of these EC demands are identified as tax havens by the EU:
Transparency
"Fair" Tax Competition
BEPS implementation (the OECD's Base Erosion and Profit Shifting minimum standards)

History

The original list in 2017 contained additional countries. Of these, 25 countries have been cleared  and removed  from the list by March 2019: Andorra, Bahrain, Faroe Islands, Greenland, Grenada, Guernsey, Hong Kong, Isle of Man, Jamaica, Jersey, Korea, Liechtenstein, Macao SAR, Malaysia, Montserrat, New Caledonia, Panama, Peru, Qatar, San Marino, Saint Vincent and the Grenadines, Taiwan, Tunisia, Turks and Caicos, and Uruguay. An additional 34 countries that have committed to compliance by the end of 2019, and form a "grey list": Albania, Anguilla, Antigua and Barbuda, Armenia, Australia, Bahamas, Bosnia and Herzegovina, Botswana, British Virgin Islands, Cabo Verde, Costa Rica, Curaçao, Cayman Islands, Cook Islands, Eswatini, Jordan, Maldives, Mauritius, Morocco, Mongolia, Montenegro, Namibia, North Macedonia, Nauru, Niue, Palau, Saint Kitts and Nevis, Saint Lucia, Serbia, Seychelles, Switzerland, Thailand, Turkey, and Vietnam.

A number of countries have not yet been screened: In 2019 Russia, Mexico and Argentina are scheduled to be screened. Other countries are planned to be brought into the scope from 2020 onwards.

On 27 March 2019, the European Parliament voted by 505 in favour to 63 against of accepting a new report that likened Luxembourg, Malta, Ireland and the Netherlands, and Cyprus to "display[ing] traits of a tax haven and facilitate beneficial tax planning".  However, despite this vote, the EU Commission is not obliged to include these EU jurisdictions on the blacklist.

List

Current listed jurisdictions 
Following this latest revision in February 2023, the EU blacklist includes the following sixteen jurisdictions: American Samoa, Anguilla, Bahamas,  British Virgin Islands, Costa Rica, Fiji, Guam, Marshall Islands, Palau, Panama, Russia, Samoa, Trinidad and Tobago, Turks and Caicos Islands, US Virgin Islands, Vanuatu. In the 2023 update,  British Virgin Islands, Costa Rica, Marshall Islands and Russia were added and North Macedonia, Barbados, Jamaica and Uruguay were removed.
In the 2021 update, Dominica was added to the blacklist and Barbados was moved to the grey list, pending a supplementary review by the Global Forum.

Sanctions 

On 16 December 2019, the EU Code of Conduct Group (Business Taxation) (CCG), under the Economic and Financial Affairs Council, published a new guidance on sanctions to be applied by EU Member States against blacklisted 'non-cooperative' jurisdictions by the end of 2020. These sanctions were immediately backed by the Finnish Presidency of the Council of the European Union called such sanctions as "defensive-measures" that are recommended to EU Member States to take against blacklisted jurisdictions.

These defensive-measures entail:

 denying deduction of costs and payments that otherwise would be deductible, when these costs and payments are treated as directed to entities or persons in blacklisted jurisdictions;
 including in the taxpayer company's tax base the income of an entity resident or a permanent establishment situated in a blacklisted jurisdiction, in accordance with the Anti-Tax Avoidance Directive rules for controlled foreign companies;
 applying a withholding tax at a higher rate on payments such as interest, royalties, service fee or remuneration, when these payments are treated as received in blacklisted jurisdictions; and
 for those Member States with rules that permit excluding or deducting dividends or other profits received from foreign subsidiaries, denying or limiting these 'participation exemptions' if the dividends or other profits are treated as received from a blacklisted jurisdiction.

Member States are requested to apply at least one of these measures from 1 January 2021 at the latest. Furthermore, Member States are entitled to apply their own additional measures or to maintain their own lists of non-cooperative jurisdictions at the national level.

By the end of 2021, an overview of sanctions applied by Member States will take place, and as of 2022, the CCG will assess the need for further coordination of defensive measures.

See also 
European company law
Common Consolidated Corporate Tax Base
Corporate haven

References 
Text was copied from this source, which is © European Union, 1995–2018. Reuse is authorised, provided the source is acknowledged.

External links 
Interactive map by Oxfam

European Commission projects
Tax avoidance
Offshore finance
Taxation-related lists
International taxation
International finance
Corporate tax avoidance
Tax evasion
Tax law
Global issues